Monteleone Rocca Doria is a comune (municipality) in the Province of Sassari in the Italian region Sardinia, located about  northwest of Cagliari and about  south of Sassari.

Monteleone Rocca Doria borders the following municipalities: Padria, Romana, Villanova Monteleone.

Demographic evolution

References

Cities and towns in Sardinia